Tetracis fuscata is a moth of the family Geometridae first described by George Duryea Hulst in 1898. It is only known from the US states of Colorado and Wyoming.

The length of the forewings 19–23 mm. Adults are on wing from late August to September, but this varies annually depending upon climatic conditions and flight ceases with the onset of the first hard mountain frost.

External links
Revision of the North American genera Tetracis Guenée and synonymization of Synaxis Hulst with descriptions of three new species (Lepidoptera: Geometridae: Ennominae)

Tetracis
Moths described in 1898